The Bofors 120 mm gun is a nickname or designation given to several types of guns designed and developed by the Swedish company Bofors:

Bofors 120 mm Automatic Gun L/46
Bofors 120 mm Naval Automatic Gun L/50

Other equivalent disambiguation pages 
Bofors 40 mm gun
Bofors 57 mm gun